Ivnyak is a rural locality (a village) in Komyanskoye Rural Settlement, Gryazovetsky District, Vologda Oblast, Russia. The population was 11 as of 2002.

Geography 
Ivnyak is located 30 km northeast of Gryazovets (the district's administrative centre) by road. Zarechye is the nearest rural locality.

References 

Rural localities in Gryazovetsky District